Henrietta is an unincorporated community in Johnson County, in the U.S. state of Missouri.

History
A post office called Henrietta was established in 1877, and remained in operation until 1904. The community took its name from a local Grange hall of the same name.

References

Unincorporated communities in Johnson County, Missouri
Unincorporated communities in Missouri